Thomas George Owen-Evans (born 18 March 1997) is an English footballer who plays for Kidderminster Harriers as a midfielder.

Early life
Born in Bristol, Owen-Evans was raised in the Forest of Dean. He is childhood friends with fellow Newport academy graduate Kieran Parselle having attended the same school in Bristol.

Career
Owen-Evans is a product of the Newport County Academy. In the 2014–15 season he was an unused substitute in a number of League Two matches under managers Justin Edinburgh and Jimmy Dack. He made his Football League debut for Newport County under Dack aged 18 on 25 April 2015 as a second-half substitute in a League Two match versus York City. Newport won the match 2–0. He signed his first senior contract with Newport a month later in May 2015.

Owen-Evans started the 2015–16 season by coming off the bench in County's 3–0 away loss to Cambridge United.

On 23 September 2016, Owen-Evans joined Gloucester City on loan until 1 January 2017, as cover for injured midfielder Chris Knowles. A clerical error during his signing almost resulted in him missing his first match, having signed incorrect contract papers forcing him to return to Newport to complete the move. Despite this, he made his debut for the club during a 3–1 defeat to Harrogate Town. He was recalled by Newport on 7 November 2016. He scored his first goal for Newport on 10 December 2016 in a League Two match against Morecambe but the match was abandoned at half-time due to a waterlogged pitch with Newport leading 1–0 so the goal was struck from the records. Owen-Evans scored his first recorded goal in a 1–0 League Two win against Exeter City on 8 April 2017. Owen-Evans was part of the Newport squad that completed the 'Great Escape' with a 2–1 victory at home to Notts County on the final day of the 2016–17 season, which ensured Newport's survival in League Two. On 11 May 2017 Owen-Evans signed a new two-year contract with Newport County.

On 28 February 2018 Owen-Evans joined Truro City on loan until the end of the 2017–18 season.

Owen-Evans moved to Scottish Championship club Falkirk in June 2018. He agreed mutual termination of his contract on 24 October 2018.

On 26 October 2018 Owen-Evans signed for National League North club Hereford. He signed an 18-month contract with Hereford in January 2019.

On 27 May 2022, Owen-Evans signed for fellow National League North club Kidderminster Harriers on a one-year deal.

Career statistics

References

External links

Living people
1997 births
English footballers
Association football midfielders
Newport County A.F.C. players
Gloucester City A.F.C. players
Truro City F.C. players
Falkirk F.C. players
Hereford F.C. players
Kidderminster Harriers F.C. players
English Football League players
Scottish Professional Football League players
National League (English football) players